Bang Pakong is a district (amphoe) in the western part of Chachoengsao province in central Thailand.

Bang Pakong District's name comes from the Bang Pakong River. The area has many industrial estates, including the huge gas- and oil-fired Bang Pakong Power Station and a 180 rai Carabao energy drink production center.

History
Bang Pakong district was established in 1907. The first temporary district office was a building within the Wat Bon Khongkharam. In 1908 the government moved the office to the bank of the Bang Pakong River in Tambon Tha Sa-an, which is still the location today.

Geography
Neighboring districts are (from the north clockwise): Ban Pho of Chachoengsao Province, Phan Thong and Mueang Chon Buri of Chon Buri province, the Bay of Bangkok, and Samut Prakan province.

The important water resource is the Bang Pakong River, which empties into the Bay of Bangkok. The Bang Na-Trat Highway runs through the district.

Environment
The Marine Department of Thailand's Transport Ministry commissioned a 6.9 million baht study in 2019 which focuses on dredging a section of the 231 kilometre-long Bang Pakong River in the district. The study is to be completed by January 2020. The purpose of the proposed development is to enable the shipment of goods from Prachinburi and Sa Kaeo as part of the Eastern Economic Corridor (EEC) project.

Economy
Carabao Group completed work on a new energy drink production center in Bang Pakong District in mid-2018. The 8.7 billion baht, 180 rai facility includes a glass bottle plant, an aluminum can plant, and a bottling plant. Bottle production will increase to 1.6 billion bottles per year, up from 1 billion, and can production will increase from 800 million per year to 1.5 billion. Future plans include a fourth factory on the site.

Administration

Central administration 
Bang Pakong is divided into 12 sub-districts (tambons), which are further subdivided into 99 administrative villages (muban).

Local administration 
There are 10 sub-district municipalities (thesaban tambons) in the district:
 Bang Pakong Phrom Thep San consisting of parts of sub-district Bang Pakong.
 Bang Samak consisting of parts of sub-district Bang Samak.
 Bang Phueng consisting of the sub-district Bang Phueng.
 Tha Kham consisting of the sub-district Tha Kham.
 Tha Sa-an consisting of parts of sub-district Tha Sa-an.
 Hom Sin consisting of parts of sub-district Hom Sin.
 Bang Pakong consisting of parts of sub-district Bang Pakong.
 Bang Wua consisting of parts of the sub-districts Bang Wua, Bang Samak, Bang Kluea.
 Phimpha consisting of the sub-district Phimpha.
 Bang Wua Khana Rak consisting of parts of sub-district Bang Wua.

There are six sub-district administrative organizations (SAO) in the district:
 Tha Sa-an consisting of parts of sub-district Tha Sa-an.
 Bang Kluea consisting of parts of sub-district Bang Kluea.
 Song Khlong consisting of sub-district Song Khlong.
 Nong Chok consisting of sub-district Nong Chok.
 Hom Sin consisting of parts of sub-district Hom Sin.
 Khao Din consisting of sub-district Khao Din.

References

External links
amphoe.com (Thai)

Bang Pakong